Domenico "Mimmo" Palmara (25 July 1928 – 10 June 2016) was an Italian actor.

Biography

Born in Cagliari, Palmara made his film debut in 1952 as a character actor in drama films by eminent directors such as Luchino Visconti, Mario Monicelli and Antonio Pietrangeli, then obtained main roles in a great number of genre films, especially adventure films and peplum films. When the sword and sandals genre declined, he took part at a number of Spaghetti Westerns in which he is usually credited as Dick Palmer. A close friend of Sergio Leone, he was Leone's first choice for the role of Ramon in A Fistful of Dollars; Palmara eventually chose to star in Mario Caiano's Bullets Don't Argue and the role of Ramon was played by Gian Maria Volonté.

Selected filmography

 Deceit (1952) - Un uomo in canottiera
 The Queen of Sheba (1952) - Ally of Sheba
 Sins of Rome (1953) - Gladiator (uncredited)
 Empty Eyes (1953) - Marcella's Fiancé (uncredited)
 Senso (1954) - Un soldato (uncredited)
 Attila (1954) - Lottatore
 The River Girl (1954)
 Proibito (1955)
 War and Peace (1956) - French Officer (uncredited)
 Roland the Mighty (1956) - Argalia
 Terrore sulla città (1957)
 White Nights (1957) - L'uomo che gioca a carte con la prostituta (uncredited)
 Serenata a Maria (1957) - Beppe Franchini, the truckdriver
 Marisa la civetta (1957) - Sailor (uncredited)
 Hercules (1958) - Iphitus, Son of Pelias
 Hercules Unchained (1959) - Polinices
 Sheba and the Gladiator (1959) - Lator
 Caterina Sforza, la leonessa di Romagna (1959)
 The Last Days of Pompeii (1959) - Gallinus, a Praetorian Guard
 Gastone (1960) - Manager
 Goliath Against the Giants (1961) - (uncredited)
 The Colossus of Rhodes (1961) - Ares
 Hercules and the Conquest of Atlantis (1961) - Astor, il Gran Visir
 The Trojan Horse (1961) - Ajax
 Tharus Son of Attila (1962) - Gudrum
 Appuntamento in riviera (1962) - De Marchi
 Sodom and Gomorrah (1962) - Arno
 Slave Girls of Sheba (1963) - Hibrahim / Jaspar
 Goliath and the Sins of Babylon (1963) - Alceas
 Goliath and the Rebel Slave (1963) - Artafernes
 Hercules and the Masked Rider (1963) - Don Juan
 The Ten Gladiators (1963) - Tigelinus
 Sandokan the Great (1963)
 Temple of the White Elephant (1964) - Parvati Sandok
 Hercules Against Rome (1964) - Lucio Traiano
 The Two Gladiators (1964) - Commodo
 Pirates of Malaysia (1964) - Tremal-Naïk
 Bullets Don't Argue (1964) - Santero
 3 Avengers (1964) - False Ursus
 Three Swords for Rome (1964) - Maximo
 Kindar the Invulnerable (1965) - Seymuth
 Serenade for Two Spies (1965) - Cormoran
 For One Thousand Dollars Per Day (1966) - Steve Benson
 Two Sons of Ringo (1966) - Sceriffo
 Argoman the Fantastic Superman (1967) - Kurt, Main Henchman of Jenabel
 Poker with Pistols (1967) - Master
 Left Handed Johnny West (1967) - Jonny West
 The Handsome, the Ugly, and the Stupid (1967) - Il bello
 The Stranger (1967) - Masson
 Vengeance Is My Forgiveness (1968) - Jack Owen
 Una forca per un bastardo (1968) - Sheriff Allan Phillip
 A Long Ride from Hell (1968) - Sheriff Max Freeman
 Psychopath (1968) - Maurice
 L'Odissea (1968, TV Mini-Series) - Achille
 Execution (1968) - Clips
 Trusting Is Good... Shooting Is Better (1968) - Frank Richards
 The Son of Black Eagle (1968) - Alexej Andrejevich
 Black Jack (1968) - Indian Joe
 Time and Place for Killing (1968) - Manuel Trianas
 Indovina chi viene a merenda? (1969) - Comandante Tiger
 Ms. Stiletto (1969) - Baron Eric von Nutter
 Franco, Ciccio e il pirata Barbanera (1969) - Il Pirata Flint
 Rangers: attacco ora X (1970) - Captain Cabot
 Le Voyou (1970)
 The Tigers of Mompracem (1970) - Man Saved from Crocodiles
 The Deserter (1971) - Apache Chief Mangus Durango
 Una pistola per cento croci (1971) - Luis / Louis / Frank Damon
 He Was Called Holy Ghost (1971) - Indian Sheriff
 Panhandle 38 (1972) - Sheriff Jones
 The Arena (1974) - Rufinius
 Catene (1974) - Giovanni
 Violent City (1975) - De Julis
 That Malicious Age (1975) - Waterloo
 Natale in casa d'appuntamento (1976) - Alberto
 Convoy Busters (1978) - Corchi
 Sicilian Connection (1987) - Dr. De Majo
 28° minuto (1991) - Police commissioner
 A Cold, Cold Winter (1996) - Leo (final film role)

References

External links
 
 Obituary

1928 births
2016 deaths
Italian male film actors
People from Cagliari
Male Spaghetti Western actors